Țicleni is a town in Gorj County, Oltenia, Romania.

It is a community developed around the exploitation of extractive industries: oil and natural gas. 
The relief is predominantly hilly, with deciduous forests (some are century-old oaks) and conifers, with views of great beauty. Fauna includes rabbits, deer, foxes, wild boar.

Of the county's nine cities and towns, it is in sixth place.

It was raised to the status of town in 1968. It is established by uniting three main parts, from north to south: Tunși, Țicleni, and Gura Lumezii, plus 3 former settlements of workers in the oil field, now upgraded.

The town has a stadium and owns a football team, FC Petrolul Țicleni. In the past here was a spa with warm water. The city has medical units, a gymnasium, four primary schools, five kindergartens, four churches, a municipal library, a High School of Industrial Oil, restaurants, general stores and a local television station.

Natives
 Norbert Niță

Sites and Monuments

References

 

Towns in Romania
Populated places in Gorj County
Localities in Oltenia